Echinoneoida is an order of echinoderms belonging to the class Echinoidea.

Families:
 Conulidae
 Echinoneidae
 Galeritidae
 Neoglobatoridae

References

 
Echinoidea